Jason Cole Critchlow (born February 25, 1998), known professionally as Jay Critch, is an American rapper, singer and songwriter. He is currently signed with Rich Forever Music.

Early life
Jason Cole Critchlow grew up in the Clinton Hill neighborhood of Brooklyn, New York. He was born on February 25, 1998, to a Trinidadian mother and a British-Guyanese father. As a child, he was fascinated by listening to his older brother rap. Critch grew up listening to Fabolous, Lil Wayne, and Jay-Z, as well as many rappers from New York City.

Career
Jay Critch's first major collaboration was with Rowdy Rebel on the song "Man Down" in 2015. In 2016, he began uploading songs on SoundCloud. He became the subject of widespread attention in 2016, when his song "Did It Again" was remixed by Rich the Kid, who signed him to Rich Forever Music in November. Their collaboration went viral, with the music video gaining over a million views in the first week of its release.

In November 2018, as a newly signed artist, Jay Critch released his debut solo mixtape, Hood Favorite. It features guest appearances from Offset, French Montana and Fabolous. He also was featured on Lil Tjay's "Ruthless", which was certified platinum.

In December 2020, Jay Critch released his third mixtape, Signed with Love.

On May 5, 2021, Jay returned with his mixtape, Critch Tape. Announced just hours before its release, the project contains 23 songs, with features from Fivio Foreign, Lil Tjay, and Drakeo the Ruler, among others.

Discography

Mixtapes

References

1998 births
Living people
American male rappers
East Coast hip hop musicians
Rappers from Brooklyn
American people of Guyanese descent
American rappers of Trinidad and Tobago descent
Caribbean people
Interscope Records artists
Trap musicians